The 1981 Swedish Open was a men's professional tennis tournament played on outdoor clay courts and held in Båstad, Sweden. It was part of the 1981 Grand Prix circuit. It was the 34th edition of the tournament and was held from July 20 through July 27, 1981. Sixth-seeded Thierry Tulasne won the singles title.

Finals

Singles

 Thierry Tulasne defeated  Anders Jarryd 6–2, 6–3
 It was Tulasne's only singles title of the year and the first of his career.

Doubles

 Mark Edmondson /  John Fitzgerald  defeated  Anders Jarryd /  Hans Simonsson 2–6, 7–5, 6–0

References

External links
 ITF tournament edition details

Swedish Open
Swedish Open
Swedish Open
Swedish Open